Stefan Köllner (born 11 September 1984) is a German modern pentathlete. He competed at the 2012 Summer Olympics.

References

External links
 

1984 births
Living people
German male modern pentathletes
Olympic modern pentathletes of Germany
Modern pentathletes at the 2012 Summer Olympics
Sportspeople from Potsdam
World Modern Pentathlon Championships medalists